Cuvântul is a newspaper from Rezina, the Republic of Moldova, founded in 1995 by Tudor Iaşcenco.

See also 
 List of newspapers in Moldova

References

External links 
 cuvintul.md

Rezina District
Newspapers established in 1995
Romanian-language newspapers published in Moldova
Newspapers published in Moldova

ro:Cuvântul